Brătulești may refer to several villages in Romania:

 Brătulești, a village in Corod Commune, Galați County
 Brătulești, a village in Strunga Commune, Iași County
 Brătulești, a former village in Periș Commune, Ilfov County